Îlot ( meaning "small island" in English) may refer to:
 
 Îlot des Capucins
 Îlot du Diable
 Îlot de La Boisselle
 Îlot Pasteur 
 Îlot-Trafalgar-Gleneagles
 Ilots du Mouillage
 Îlots des Rashad el Jabr